Central European may mean:

 A person of one of a Central European ethnic group
 Relating to or characteristic of Central Europe or its inhabitants

Culture
 Central European cuisine, cuisine typical to Central Europe
 Central European University, a graduate-level, English-language university promoting a distinctively Central European perspective
 Central European University Press
 Central European Free Trade Agreement, a free trade area established by central European countries
 Central European Initiative, a forum of regional cooperation
 Central European Media Enterprises, a Bermuda-based media and entertainment company
 Serbian Orthodox Eparchy of Central Europe, former name of the Serbian Orthodox Eparchy of Frankfurt and all of Germany
 Central European History, a peer-reviewed academic journal on history published quarterly by Cambridge University Press
 Central European Time, time zone used in most parts of the European Union
 Central European Jamboree, a Scouting jamboree
 Central European Exchange Program for University Studies, an international exchange program

History
 Urnfield culture (c. 1300 BC – 750 BC), a late Bronze Age culture of Central Europe
 Lusatian culture (1300 BCE – 500 BCE), a late Bronze Age and early Iron Age in Central Europe
 Hallstatt culture, the predominant Central European culture from the 8th to 6th centuries BC
 Central Europe Campaign, Western Allied invasion of Germany

Sport
 Central European Football League, a regional American football league
 Central European Tour Budapest GP, a cycling race in Hungary
 Central European Tour Miskolc GP,  is a cycling race in Hungary
 Central European International Cup, an international football competition held by certain national teams from Central Europe between 1927 and 1960
 2008 Central Europe Rally, a rally raid endurance race held in Romania and Hungary
 2023 Central Europe Rally, a rally race held in Germany, Austria and Czech Republic
 Ladies Central European Open, a women's professional golf tournament on the Ladies European Tour
 Central European Australian Football League Championships, an Australian rules football tournament
 Mitropa Cup, officially called the La Coupe de l'Europe Centrale, was one of the first international major European football cups for club sides

See also
 European Union, a European supranational entity (federation)
 Europe (disambiguation)
 EU (disambiguation)
 Euro (disambiguation)